Sir Richard Roy Maconachie, KBE, CIE (1885 - 18 January 1962) was an English civil servant in India, naturalist and BBC employee.

He studied at Tonbridge School in Kent, England and University College, Oxford before joining the Indian Civil Service. In 1923, he played billiards with Amanullah Khan, then the Emir of Afghanistan.

He was British Minister in Kabul, Afghanistan from 1929 to 1935.During his time in Afghanistan, Maconachie assembled a collection of native birds that he later presented to the Natural History Museum at Tring in Tring, England (BMNH 1935-12-28). These bird skins became the basis of ornithologist Hugh Whistler's paper on the birds of Afghanistan in the Journal of the Bombay Natural History Society in 1944–45.

In 1936, he succeeded Charles Siepmann as head of Talks at the BBC. It was widely considered a "swing to the right".

Offices held

Literature
 Warr, F. E.: Manuscripts and Drawings in the ornithology and Rothschild libraries of The Natural History Museum at Tring, BOC 1996.

References

English naturalists
1962 deaths
1885 births
Ambassadors of the United Kingdom to Afghanistan
English civil servants
English ornithologists
People educated at Tonbridge School
Alumni of University College, Oxford
Indian Civil Service (British India) officers
20th-century British zoologists
20th-century naturalists
Members of the Bombay Natural History Society
British people in colonial India